Jan Keller is a Czech sociologist and politician. Since 2014, he has been a Member of the European Parliament representing the Czech Republic, elected as a non-partisan for the Social Democratic Party. He publishes political commentaries and essays mainly in the Czech daily Právo.

In the 1970s and 1980s he was a member of the Communist Party of Czechoslovakia.

Parliamentary service
Member, Committee on Employment and Social Affairs
Member, Delegation for relations with Canada
Member, Delegation to the Euronest Parliamentary Assembly

References

Living people
1955 births
Czech sociologists
MEPs for the Czech Republic 2014–2019
Czech Social Democratic Party MEPs
Communist Party of Czechoslovakia politicians
Masaryk University alumni
People from Frýdek-Místek
Recipients of Medal of Merit (Czech Republic)